Eupithecia cupressata is a moth in the family Geometridae. It is found in the Alameda, Mendocino, and Monterey counties in central coastal California.

The length of the forewings is 12–14 mm for both males and females. The forewings are medium brown, speckled with whitish and darker brown scales along the veins. The hindwings are slightly paler than the forewings. Adults are on wing from March to December.

Larvae have been reared on Cupressus macrocarpa and possibly also feed on Sequoia sempervirens.

References

Moths described in 1910
cupressata
Moths of North America